Santiago 'Santi' Villa Castro (born 5 August 1982) is a Spanish footballer who plays as a winger.

He spent most of his career in Segunda División B, playing 403 games and scoring over 71 goals for ten teams, mostly Jaén, with whom he also made 15 Segunda División appearances in 2013–14.

Club career
Born in Linares, Jaén, Andalusia, Villa spent his first 12 seasons as a senior alternating between Segunda División B and Tercera División. He represented in the process Real Balompédica Linense, Atlético Madrid C, CD Logroñés, ACD San Marcial, CD Corralejo, CD Calahorra, CD Quintanar del Rey, Granada CF, Real Murcia Imperial, FC Torrevieja, Ontinyent CF, Orihuela CF, Pontevedra CF, CF Atlético Ciudad, CF Badalona, CP Cacereño and Real Jaén, achieving promotion with the latter to Segunda División in the 2012–13 campaign, to which he contributed 41 games and five goals (playoffs included).

On 18 August 2013, at already 31, Villa played his first game as a professional, starting in a 1–2 league home loss against SD Eibar. He appeared in 15 matches as the team dropped back to the third tier, and continued playing and scoring regularly for them at that level. He had his best yield of 12 goals in 2016–17 – including a hat-trick on 27 November in a 4–2 home win over Atlético Sanluqueño CF– though the club fell into the fourth division.

Villa left Jaén in June 2017, signing for Mérida AD. He was the most-used player as they too were relegated in his first season (via the playoffs), and was preparing to leave before committing himself to the team for the next campaign. After the Extremadurans bounced immediately back to the third tier, he extended his contract by another year in July 2019.

References

External links

1982 births
Living people
People from Linares, Jaén
Sportspeople from the Province of Jaén (Spain)
Spanish footballers
Footballers from Andalusia
Association football wingers
Segunda División players
Segunda División B players
Tercera División players
Real Balompédica Linense footballers
Atlético Madrid C players
CD Logroñés footballers
Granada CF footballers
Real Murcia Imperial players
CD Torrevieja players
Ontinyent CF players
Orihuela CF players
Pontevedra CF footballers
CF Badalona players
CP Cacereño players
Real Jaén footballers
Mérida AD players